Stuffed flatbread may refer to the following food items:

See also
Burrito
List of sandwiches
Wrap (food)

Flatbread dishes